Ferntree Gully railway station is located on the Belgrave line in Victoria, Australia. It serves the eastern Melbourne suburb of Ferntree Gully, and opened on 5 December 1889 as Lower Ferntree Gully. It was renamed Ferntree Gully on 1 October 1962, and renamed Fern Tree Gully on 29 February 1972.

History

Ferntree Gully station opened on 5 December 1889, when the line from Ringwood was extended to Upper Ferntree Gully. Like the suburb itself, the station was named after a fern tree gully that is located nearby in the Dandenong Ranges National Park. Although most references to the station still use the 1962 version of the name, there is no evidence that it has ever officially been changed back.

In 1955, a goods siding at the station was abolished and, on 19 December 1959, the station was closed to all goods traffic. In 1963, flashing light signals were provided at the Alpine Street level crossing, located nearby in the down direction of the station.

In 1976, the current station buildings were provided, when the former signal panel was relocated into the new building. In 1977, the panel was abolished. In that same year, boom barriers were provided at the Alpine Street level crossing.

On 18 November 2008, it was announced that the station would be upgraded to a Premium Station. Work began in early 2009, and was completed by December of that same year. On 31 July 2017, with a budget of $20 million, work began to add 215 new parking spaces at the station, which was completed by 1 December of that year.

South of the station, the double track railway becomes single track through to Belgrave.

Platforms and services

Ferntree Gully has two side platforms. It is served by Belgrave line trains.

Platform 1:
  all stations and limited express services to Flinders Street; all stations shuttle services to Ringwood

Platform 2:
  all stations services to Upper Ferntree Gully and Belgrave

Transport links

Ventura Bus Lines operates five routes via Ferntree Gully station, under contract to Public Transport Victoria:
 : Boronia station – Waverley Gardens Shopping Centre
 : Belgrave station – Oakleigh station
 : Bayswater station – Westfield Knox
  : Glen Waverley station – Croydon station (Saturday and Sunday mornings only)

Gallery

References

External links
 
 Melway map at street-directory.com.au

Premium Melbourne railway stations
Railway stations in Melbourne
Railway stations in Australia opened in 1889
Railway stations in the City of Knox